The Tour de L'Île-Rousse is a ruined Genoese tower located on the Île de la Petra in the commune of L'Île-Rousse off the west coast of the French island of Corsica.

The tower was one of a series of coastal defences constructed by the Republic of Genoa between 1530 and 1620 to stem the attacks by Barbary pirates.

References

Towers in Corsica